A seven-part abrogative referendum was held in Italy on 15 June 1997. Voters were asked whether they approved of the repealing of laws on topics including privatisation, conscientious objectors, hunting, the judiciary and journalists, as well as whether the Ministry of Agrarian Politics should be abolished. Although all seven proposals were approved by voters, the voter turnout of 30% was well below the 50% threshold and the results were invalidated.

Results

Repealing of the law on the golden share of the Minister of the Treasury during privatisation

Repealing of the law restricting conscientious objectors

Repealing of the law allowing hunters access to private property

Repealing of the law on judges' careers

Repealing of the law on admission to the Order of Journalists

Repealing of the law allowing judges to do other work

Abolishing the Ministry of Agrarian Politics

References

1997 referendums
1997 elections in Italy
Referendums in Italy
June 1997 events in Europe
Hunting referendums